Joseph Michel Filippi (10 August 1875 – 25 March 1951) was a French fencer. He competed in the men's masters foil event at the 1900 Summer Olympics.

References

External links
 

1875 births
1951 deaths
French male foil fencers
Olympic fencers of France
Fencers at the 1900 Summer Olympics
Fencers from Paris